Szymbark is a village in the administrative district of Gmina Stężyca, within Kartuzy County, Pomeranian Voivodeship, in northern Poland.

The town has an open-air museum featuring traditional Kashubian wooden houses, an upside-down house, and the longest wooden plank in the world (measuring 38.83 meters).  

For details of the history of the region, see History of Pomerania.

The village has a population of 541.

References

Szymbark